Roger Henrichsen (12 February 1876, in Copenhagen – 12 January 1926, in Copenhagen) was a Danish composer and pianist.  He was the brother of Edgar Henrichsen, and was a student of Louis Glass.  His son was the jazz pianist Børge Roger-Henrichsen.

1876 births
1926 deaths
Danish composers
Male composers
Danish classical pianists
People from Copenhagen
19th-century classical pianists
Male classical pianists
19th-century male musicians